Washington contains 11 state forests. These sites are managed by the Department of Natural Resources.

Washington state forests

See also
 List of U.S. National Forests

Washington
State forests